Greene County is a county located on the eastern border of the U.S. state of Tennessee. As of the 2020 census, the population was 70,152. Its county seat is Greeneville. Greene County comprises the Greeneville, TN Micropolitan Statistical Area.

History

Greene County developed from the "Nolichucky settlement," established by pioneer Jacob Brown on land leased in the early 1770s from the Cherokee people. The Nolichucky settlement was aligned with the Watauga settlement, centered in modern Elizabethton.

After the United States became independent, Greene County was formed in 1783 from the original Washington County, North Carolina, part of the former Washington District. The county is named for Major General Nathanael Greene (1742-1786), a major general in the Continental Army from Rhode Island. John Crockett, father of Davy Crockett, and his wife settled in the county near Limestone. Davy Crockett was born there in 1786. At the time, the area was part of the extra-legal state Franklin.

Greene County is the home of Tusculum College, the oldest college in Tennessee; the state's oldest Methodist congregation (the Ebenezer Methodist Church, near Chuckey), and the state's second oldest continuously cultivated farm (Elmwood Farm, part of the Earnest Farms Historic District). Revolutionary War veteran, and state legislator, Col. Joseph Hardin made Greene County his home for a period of time, serving as justice of the peace and as one of the original trustees of Tusculum (then Greeneville) College.

As with yeomen farmers in much of East Tennessee, those in Greene County were generally Unionist and opposed to secession on the eve of the Civil War. In Tennessee's Ordinance of Secession referendum on June 8, 1861, Greene Countians voted against secession by a vote of 2,691 to 744.  Following the vote (the call for secession was passed statewide), the second session of the East Tennessee Convention convened in Greeneville. It called for a separate, Union-aligned state to be formed in East Tennessee.

A railroad bridge near Mosheim was among those destroyed by the East Tennessee bridge-burning conspiracy in November 1861. Several of the conspirators who had taken part in the burning of this bridge were later captured and executed by Confederate supporters, including Jacob Hensie, Henry Fry, Jacob and Henry Harmon, and noted local potter Alex Haun.

Geography
Most of Greene County is located within the Ridge-and-Valley Appalachians, a range characterized by long, narrow ridges alternating with similarly shaped valleys. Bays Mountain, a prominent ridge in this range, forms much of Greene's northern border with Hawkins County. The extreme southeastern part of Greene County is located within the Blue Ridge Mountains, specifically a subrange of the Blue Ridge known as the Bald Mountains.

Greene County is drained by the Nolichucky River, which traverses the southern half of the county. This river is impounded by Nolichucky Dam south of Greeneville, creating Davy Crockett Lake.

Major highways

Adjacent counties

 Hawkins County (north)
 Washington County (east)
 Unicoi County (southeast)
 Madison County, North Carolina (south)
 Cocke County (southwest)
 Hamblen County (west)

National protected areas
 Andrew Johnson National Cemetery
 Andrew Johnson National Historic Site
 Appalachian Trail (part)
 Cherokee National Forest (part)

State protected areas
 Bible Covered Bridge State Historic Site
 Joachim Bible Refuge 
 David Crockett Birthplace State Park (part)
 Lick Creek Bottoms Wildlife Management Area
 Nolichucky Wildlife Management Area
 Rocky Fork State Park (part)

Other historic sites
 Earnest Farms Historic District
 Greeneville Historic District
 Maden Hall Farm

Government

Elected Officials

County Mayor
Kevin Morrison was elected County Mayor in August 2018 and began as mayor on September 1, 2018.

County Commission
Members of the county commission are elected by geographic district. They are as follows:
 District 1: Baileyton, Ottway, West Pines
 Charles Tim White 
 Dale Tucker 
 Kathy Crawford
 District 2: Chuckey, Chuckey Doak
 Brad Peters 
 Kaleb Powell
 Joshua Arrowood 
 District 3: Doak, Tusculum View
 Robin Quillen
 Jason Cobble
 Clifford "Doc" Bryant
 District 4: Camp Creek, Courthouse
 George Clemmer 
 Bill Dabbs
 Lyle Parton 
 District 5: Debusk, Nolachuckey, Middle School, South Greene
 Lloyd "Hoot" Bowers
 Pamela Carpenter
 Gary Shelton 
 District 6: McDonald, Mosheim
 Jeffrey Bible
 Josh Kesterson 
 John Waddle 
 District 7: Glenwood, Greeneville High School
 Teddy Lawing
 Paul Burkey
 VACANT

Presidential elections
Like all of East Tennessee, Greene County is a Republican stronghold. The last Democratic presidential candidate to carry this county was Franklin D. Roosevelt in 1936.

Demographics

2020 census

As of the 2020 United States census, there were 70,152 people, 28,323 households, and 18,481 families residing in the county.

2000 census
As of the census of 2000, there were 62,909 people, 25,756 households, and 18,132 families residing in the county. The population density was 101 people per square mile (39/km2). There were 28,116 housing units at an average density of 45 per square mile (17/km2). The racial makeup of the county was 96.42% White, 2.11% Black or African American, 0.18% Native American, 0.27% Asian, 0.02% Pacific Islander, 0.43% from other races, and 0.56% from two or more races. 1.02% of the population were Hispanic or Latino of any race.

There were 25,756 households, out of which 29.20% had children under the age of 18 living with them, 55.70% were married couples living together, 10.80% had a female householder with no husband present, and 29.60% were non-families. 25.80% of all households were made up of individuals, and 10.70% had someone living alone who was 65 years of age or older. The average household size was 2.38 and the average family size was 2.84.

In the county, the population was spread out, with 22.20% under the age of 18, 8.10% from 18 to 24, 28.70% from 25 to 44, 26.10% from 45 to 64, and 14.80% who were 65 years of age or older. The median age was 39 years. For every 100 females there were 95.10 males. For every 100 females age 18 and over, there were 91.40 males.

The median income for a household in the county was $30,382, and the median income for a family was $36,889. Males had a median income of $26,331 versus $20,304 for females. The per capita income for the county was $15,746. About 11.20% of families and 14.50% of the population were below the poverty line, including 19.00% of those under age 18 and 16.70% of those age 65 or over.

Education
Public schools in Greene County school system include the following, with their enrollments for the 2007–2008 school year:

Baileyton Elementary - 365 students
Camp Creek Elementary - 315 students
Chuckey Elementary - 325 students
DeBusk Elementary - 340 students
Doak Elementary - 590 students
Glenwood Elementary  - 255 students
McDonald Elementary - 410 students
Mosheim Elementary and Middle School - 960 students
Nolachuckey Elementary - 340 students
Ottway Elementary - 260 students
West Pines Elementary - 240 students
Chuckey-Doak Middle School - 495 students
Chuckey-Doak High School - 710 students
North Greene High School - 395 students
South Greene High School - 525 students
West Greene High School - 735 students

Public schools that are within Greene County but are part of the Greeneville City School System include:

Eastview Elementary
Hal Henard Elementary
Highland Elementary
Tusculum View Elementary
Greeneville Middle School
Greeneville High School
Greene Technology Center - 489 students

Hospitals

Two hospitals are located in Greene County, Greeneville Community Hospital West campus and Greeneville Community East campus. These hospitals were formally Takoma Regional Hospital and Laughlin Memorial Hospital, respectively, after Ballad Health formed from the merger between Mountain States Health Alliance and Wellmont Health System.

Communities

City
 Tusculum

Towns
 Baileyton 
 Greeneville (county seat)
 Mosheim

Census-designated place
 Fall Branch (partial)

Unincorporated communities

 Afton
 Camp Creek
 Cedar Creek
 Chuckey
 Cross Anchor
 DeBusk
 Grandview
 Horse Creek
 Jearoldstown
 Liberty Hill
 Limestone
 Midway
 Mohawk
 Newmansville
 Ottway
 Rheatown
 Romeo
 St. James
 South Greene
 Warrensburg

See also
National Register of Historic Places listings in Greene County, Tennessee

References

External links

 Official site
 The Greeneville Sun newspaper
 

 
1783 establishments in North Carolina
Populated places established in 1783
State of Franklin
Counties of Appalachia
Second Amendment sanctuaries in Tennessee
East Tennessee